The acronym LPSS may refer to:

 An amphibious assault submarine 
 Lorne Park Secondary School, a high school in Mississauga, Ontario, Canada
 Lambrick Park Secondary School, a high school in Saanich, British Columbia, Canada
 Lafayette Parish School System, a school district in Louisiana
 Lucent Public Safety Systems, a company acquired by Intrado
Labour Party South Sudan
  Low Power Subsystems, a management class of subsystems in the Linux kernel